Craig Simon (born 17 April 1973) is an Australian former professional rugby league footballer who played first-grade in Australia for the Illawarra Steelers and the South Sydney Rabbitohs. In the Super League he played for Gateshead Thunder and Hull FC.

Simon had coached in the lower grades with Shellharbour.

Craig Simon is the brother of former Australian international John Simon.

References

External links
Coach sees effects of racism in junior sport

1973 births
Living people
Australian rugby league players
Rugby league centres
Rugby league five-eighths
Illawarra Steelers players
South Sydney Rabbitohs players
Gateshead Thunder (1999) players
Hull F.C. players
Place of birth missing (living people)